The Woodlawn Preserve is a patch of the Albany Pine Bush in the Woodlawn neighborhood of the city of Schenectady, New York. It is the only remaining example of this rare ecosystem in that area, a combination of swamp, wetlands, water bodies, and dune vegetation, and one of the most biologically diverse parcels in Schenectady County .

Description
The low-lying areas of the preserve are wetlands while the higher portions are pitch pine-scrub oak barrens with some of the largest sand dunes found in the Albany Pine Bush. While the preserve has traditionally been a Karner Blue butterfly habitat, there are no current populations of the endangered species there. The preserve and neighboring lands in the town of Niskayuna are part of the Woodlawn Pine Barrens-Wetlands Complex, which is recognized by the state of New York's Open Space Conservation Plan as a priority conservation project.

History
It is the largest passive park in the city of Schenectady.

The city has been repeatedly approached by developers seeking to purchase the land for housing developments. In 1993  were requested, with an extra  to be developed as a park. This raised an outcry by the Concerned Citizens to Save the Woodlawn Preserve organization, which argued that such development contradicted the intent and purpose of establishing a nature preserve. In 2003 the Forever Wild status was still intact on the  but was again threatened by another offer of $196,000 for 196 plots.

A Quality Communities Grant was awarded to Schenectady in 2007 to promote the "preservation and beautification" of the Preserve. This coincided with the Preserve being added to the New York Open Space Conservation Plan. In 2008, a five-year plan was developed between the city and the state to organize the improvement of the Preserve.

In 2009, Schenectady County created  of protected parkland in Niskayuna within the Woodlawn Pine Barrens-Wetlands Complex, which was then deeded to the town. This was considered an important step in linking the Woodlawn Preserve and the Albany Pine Bush Preserve.

See also

List of pine barrens

Other notable pine barrens
Long Island Central Pine Barrens
Rome Sand Plains
Pine Barrens (New Jersey)

References

External links
Friends of Woodlawn Preserve

Schenectady, New York
Protected areas of Schenectady County, New York
Nature reserves in New York (state)